Penniman may refer to:

Ebenezer J. Penniman (1804–1890), politician from the U.S. state of Michigan
John Ritto Penniman (1782–1841), painter in Boston, Massachusetts, USA
Nick Penniman, the president of the Democracy Fund
Richard Wayne Penniman, stage name Little Richard
Samuel Penniman Bates (1827–1902), American educator, author, and historian

See also
Edward Penniman House and Barn, historic site in Eastham, Massachusetts
House at 83 Penniman Place, historic house at 83 Penniman Place in Brookline, Massachusetts
Penniman, Virginia, unincorporated town in northwestern York County in the United States

vo:Penniman